Dendroblatta sobrina is a species of cockroaches in the family Ectobiidae. It was first described by James A. G. Rehn in 1916. It is found in Central America and South America.

References

sobrina
Insects described in 1916
Insects of Central America
Insects of South America